The Cycle Sluts from Hell were an American heavy metal band from the late 1980s to early 1990s. The band was made up of four women singing under the stage names Queen Vixen, She-Fire of Ice, Honey One Percenter, and Venus Penis Crusher, backed by various musicians, including Pete Lisa, Christopher Moffett, Tom Von Doom, Fernando Rosario, Brian Smith, Scott Duboys, Bobby Gustafson, and Eddie Coen. 

The lyrics were written by the girls and were tongue-in-cheek and filled with innuendo. The music was primarily written by Pete Lisa, along with writing contributions from Daniel Rey, Mark Durado, Christopher Moffett, and Tom Von Doom. 
The group had a pretty high profile in the New York City area in the late 1980s and performed shows with artists such as Jane's Addiction at The Cat Club, Danzig at The Old Studio 54, Joey Ramone at the Ritz, and also at the Palladium on 14th St.

The band's self-titled debut album was their only release. The song "I Wish You Were a Beer" is their best-known track, written by Honey 1%er and Tom Von Doom. The track featured in the MTV show Beavis and Butthead, who reacted favorably to it. The band's biggest gig was a European tour with Motörhead in the early nineties.

Several of their songs are featured in the true-crime TV movie Murder in New Hampshire: The Pamela Wojas Smart Story, directed by Joyce Chopra and starring Helen Hunt and Chad Allen.

Reunions 
July 24, 2006, brought a "one-time-only" reunion of some of the original band at The Delancey in New York. In presence were Queen Vixen, Honey 1percenter, She Fire of Ice, Lord Roadkill, and Scott Duboys.

They reunited once again on October 31, 2007, for the Motherfucker Halloween party at Club Rebel in New York. Performing were Queen Vixen, Honey 1percenter, She Fire of Ice, and Lord Roadkill (accompanied by Nick Marden from The Stimulators on bass and She Wolves' Tony Mann).

Past members 
 Venus Penis Crusher, a.k.a. Betty Kallas, went on to the industrial duo Hanzel und Gretyl.
 Donna She Wolf is now writing and playing guitar in the New Orleans-based band Star & Dagger, a collaboration with Sean Yseult (White Zombie) that began in 2010, along with vocalist Von Hesseling, Dave Catching (Eagles of Death Metal) on guitar, and Gene Trautmann (Queens of the Stone Age) on drums. She also formed the group She Wolves with Tony Mann around 2000. Their early material was released on Poptown Records, including collaborations with punk musicians Sylvain Sylvain and Jayne County.
 Scott Duboys, drums, had previously played for Nuclear Assault, Cities, VonHelsing, and then joined Warrior Soul after CSFH.
 Tom Von Doom, bass, co-wrote the single "I Wish You Were a Beer", and previously played with Bebe Buell and The Great Kat. He produced the song "Waiting" by Jamie Coon, featured in the CBS show Ghost Whisperer.
 Chris Moffett went on to replace John Ricco of Warrior Soul for one CD and a European tour.

Discography 
 Cycle Sluts from Hell (self-titled, Epic Records, 1991)

References 

Other sources
[ Cycle Sluts from Hell page] at AllMusic
Cycle Sluts from Hell page at BNR Metal
The Day I Met the Cycle Sluts from Hell, by Daniela

 The Encyclopedia of Heavy Metal, Sterling, 2003,

External links 
Official website (archived)
MySpace page

1986 establishments in New York City
All-female bands
Glam metal musical groups from New York (state)
Heavy metal musical groups from New York (state)
Musical groups established in 1986
Musical groups disestablished in 1991
Musical groups reestablished in 2006
Musical groups disestablished in 2006
Musical groups reestablished in 2007
Musical groups disestablished in 2007